The Remingtons were an American country music group founded in 1991. They consisted of guitarists and vocalists Jimmy Griffin, Richard Mainegra, and Rick Yancey. Griffin was previously a member of the soft rock group Bread, while Mainegra and Yancey had previously been part of another soft rock group called Cymarron. Yancey left in 1992 and was replaced by Denny Henson. The band recorded two albums for BNA Records (then known as BNA Entertainment) and charted five country singles, including the number 10 "A Long Time Ago." The Remingtons broke up in 1993 and all four members continued in other projects.

Biography
The Remingtons were founded in 1991 by singers Jimmy Griffin, Richard Mainegra, and Rick Yancey. Griffin was a founding member of the soft rock group Bread, and both Mainegra and Yancey previously recorded in Cymarron, another soft rock band. Griffin also recorded in 1990 as one-third of Black Tie, which included country pop singer Billy Swan and former Eagles member Randy Meisner.

The Remingtons were one of the first acts signed to BNA Entertainment (later BNA Records), a country music record label founded in 1991. Their debut album, Blue Frontier, was released that year. It accounted for three straight Top 40 hits on the Billboard country charts, including the number 10 "A Long Time Ago". Yancey was replaced in 1992 by Denny Henson, a former member of Dan Fogelberg's backing band, shortly before the group released its second album, 1993's Aim for the Heart. The album still featured several songs written by Yancey, and he played acoustic guitar on the album's cover of Bread's "Everything I Own".

Griffin and Yancey, along with Ronnie Guilbeau formed GYG (Griffin, Yancey, Guilbeau) in 2001. They recorded only one album and performed in and around the Nashville area until Griffin was diagnosed with cancer and died in 2005.

Discography

Albums

Singles

Music videos

References

Country music groups from Tennessee
BNA Records artists
Musical groups established in 1991
Musical groups disestablished in 1993
Vocal trios
Musical groups from Nashville, Tennessee
1991 establishments in Tennessee